The Arkansas Baptist State Convention (ABSC) was founded on September 21, 1848, at Brownsville Church in Tulip in Dallas County, Arkansas as an affiliate of the Southern Baptist Convention.  The first president was Isaac Perkins, and its first secretary was Samuel Stevenson. James Philip Eagle, governor of Arkansas and later president of the Southern Baptist Convention, presided over the Arkansas convention for 21 years.  Another notable former Convention President was Mike Huckabee, who would later go on to serve as Governor of Arkansas and twice attempt to gain the Republican nomination for President of the United States.

Affiliated Organizations 
Arkansas Baptist Children's Homes
Arkansas Baptist News
Arkansas Baptist Foundation
Arkansas Baptist Assembly, now renamed Camp Siloam
Camp Paron
Arkansas Woman's Missionary Union
Ouachita Baptist University
Williams Baptist College

References

External links
Arkansas Baptist State Convention official website

Further reading 
 
 
 
 
 
 

Baptist Christianity in Arkansas
Conventions associated with the Southern Baptist Convention
Baptist denominations established in the 19th century
Religious organizations established in 1848
1848 establishments in Arkansas